John Beckett, Lord Beckett is a Scottish lawyer who was appointed in 2016 as a Senator of the College of Justice, a judge of the Court of Session.

Beckett was Solicitor General for Scotland, the country's junior Law Officer from October 2006 to May 2007. He was appointed by Labour First Minister Jack McConnell on the appointment of former Solicitor General Elish Angiolini to the senior role of Lord Advocate. After the 2007 Scottish election, newly elected Scottish National Party First Minister Alex Salmond replaced Labour Party member Beckett with Frank Mulholland, who later became Lord Advocate. Beckett then became floating sheriff sitting mainly at Glasgow Sheriff Court.

Early life
Beckett was born in Crawley, a town in West Sussex about 28 miles (45 km) south of London. His family moved to Edinburgh in 1968 and he was educated at Edinburgh Academy and Broughton High School before studying at the School of Law of the University of Edinburgh.

Career
Beckett worked initially as a defence solicitor in Edinburgh, and was elected to the Faculty of Advocates in 1993. He was junior defence counsel for Abdelbaset al-Megrahi under William Taylor QC during the Lockerbie trial at the Scottish Court in the Netherlands in 2000. He became an Advocate Depute and Senior Advocate Depute in 2003, and Queen's Counsel (QC) in 2005, and prosecuted the infamous murder case of baby Caleb Ness. He was appointed Principal Advocate Depute from 1 January 2006. On his appointment as Solicitor General that October, he was succeeded by Brian McConnachie.

Solicitor General
Following the resignation of Colin Boyd as Lord Advocate, Solicitor General Elish Angiolini was nominated for the post by First Minister Jack McConnell. Beckett was in turn nominated to succeed Angiolini as Solicitor General. The nomination was met with some criticism due to Beckett's membership of the Labour Party, but was ultimately approved by the Scottish Parliament on 5 October 2006. Beckett, along with Angiolini, was sworn in at the Court of Session in Edinburgh on 12 October 2006 and appointed by the Queen under the royal warrant. Beckett's appointment lasted only eight months however; the 2007 Scottish Parliament election resulted in the Scottish National Party forming a minority government, and new First Minister Alex Salmond replaced Beckett with politically neutral Frank Mulholland QC, whose appointment was approved by the Scottish Parliament without the need for a vote on 24 May 2007.

Sheriff 
In April 2008, Beckett was appointed a floating sheriff, an office enabling him to sit where required throughout Scotland's six sheriffdoms, although he sat primarily in the Sheriffdom of Glasgow and Strathkelvin at Glasgow.

Judge 
In May 2016, Beckett was appointed as a Senator of the College of Justice.
He was installed as a judge on 17 May 2016, taking the judicial title Lord Beckett.

See also
Scots law
Courts of Scotland

References 
 

Year of birth missing (living people)
Living people
People educated at Edinburgh Academy
Alumni of the University of Edinburgh
Solicitors General for Scotland
Deans of the Faculty of Advocates
People educated at Broughton High School, Edinburgh
People from Crawley
Scottish King's Counsel
21st-century King's Counsel
Scottish sheriffs
Scottish solicitors
Senators of the College of Justice
21st-century Scottish lawyers